Paweł Drumlak (born 2 March 1976) is a retired Polish football midfielder.

References

1976 births
Living people
Polish footballers
Pogoń Szczecin players
Energetyk Gryfino players
FC Luzern players
Zagłębie Lubin players
MKS Cracovia (football) players
ŁKS Łódź players
Association football midfielders
Poland international footballers
Sportspeople from Szczecin
Polish expatriate footballers
Expatriate footballers in Switzerland
Polish expatriate sportspeople in Switzerland